Epidemiology and Infection  is a peer-reviewed medical journal that contains original reports and reviews on all aspects of infection in humans and animals. Some of these aspects include zoonoses, tropical infections, food hygiene, and vaccine studies.

According to the Journal Citation Reports, the journal has a 2020 impact factor of 2.455.

References

External links 
 

Epidemiology journals
Cambridge University Press academic journals
Microbiology journals
Monthly journals
English-language journals
Publications established in 1901